The Honolulu Record was a newspaper established in 1948 by Koji Ariyoshi, a Hawaiian Nisei labor activist and war veteran with support from the International Longshore and Warehouse Union.

History 
A Pro Communist Party Newspaper.The Record earned a strong reputation for its muckraking investigative journalism.  In 1950, it revealed that a much-praised 14-year professor at the University of Hawaii, Shunzo Sakamaki, had been denied tenure simply because he was Japanese - and that no "local product" had ever been promoted to full professorship.  Ariyoshi's dogged four-year campaign eventually resulted in the tenureship of Professor Sakamaki.

The paper ceased publication in 1958.

References

External links
 Report on the Honolulu record  by The Committee on Un-American Activities

Works about labor
Publications established in 1948
Publications disestablished in 1958
1948 establishments in Hawaii
1958 disestablishments in Hawaii
Defunct newspapers published in Hawaii